Pitelis is a lake in Northern Europe. It is located on the border between Latvia and the Pskov Oblast of Russia.

References

Lakes of Latvia
International lakes of Europe
Latvia–Russia border
Lakes of Pskov Oblast